Chris Molnar is a writer, editor, filmmaker and publisher. He is the co-founder of The Writer's Block bookstore in Las Vegas, and editorial director of Archway Editions, the literary imprint of powerHouse Books distributed by Simon & Schuster.

Work

A graduate of Calvin College with an MFA from Columbia University, Molnar has written criticism for cokemachineglow, BOMB, and The Shadow, among others, and fiction for outlets such as Vol. 1 Brooklyn. Prior to The Writer's Block, he worked with the other co-founders as store manager at 826NYC/The Brooklyn Superhero Supply Co. A longtime resident of Bullet Space, the artists' collective and former squat in the East Village, he has also written texts for the nearby Ki Smith Gallery, and curated for the literary KGB Bar.

Currently he runs Archway Editions, the literary imprint of powerHouse Books. Molnar's published work includes editing the anthologies Unpublishable and Archways 1, which feature authors such as James Cañón, Jean Kyoung Frazier, John Farris, and Cyrée Jarelle Johnson - as well as fiction in Unpublishable and NDA: An Autofiction Anthology. Future projects include editing a full volume of poems by John Farris.

Bibliography

Edited volumes
 Unpublishable (2020). Archway/powerHouse 
 Archways 1 (2023). Archway/powerHouse

Anthologies
 Unpublishable (2020). Archway/powerHouse  "End of time" from Hellscape
 NDA: An Autofiction Anthology (2022). Archway/powerHouse  "Radio Cure" from Hellscape

References

External links 
 Official Website

Living people
Calvin University alumni
Columbia University alumni
American writers of Chinese descent
American male short story writers
American short story writers
Writers from Manhattan
Writers from Michigan
People from the East Village, Manhattan
Year of birth missing (living people)